Yurin may refer to:

 Andriy Yurin (born 1984), Ukrainian race walker
 Konon Berman-Yurin (1901–1936), Latvian Communist
 Olexiy Yurin (born 1982), Ukrainian poet, pedagogue, and interpreter
 Vladimir Yurin (1947–2016), Soviet and Russian footballer and coach
 Yurin (actress) (ゆりん, born 1981), Japanese actress, voice actress and singer
 Igor Yurin (born 1982), Kazakh football player. Currently a member of FC Okzhetpes in the Kazakhstan Premier League.

See also
 

Russian-language surnames
Ukrainian-language surnames